Eleotris is a genus of fish in the family Eleotridae with a circumglobal distribution in tropical and subtropical regions.

Species
There are currently 27 recognized species in this genus:
 Eleotris acanthopoma Bleeker, 1853 (Spiny sleeper)
 Eleotris amblyopsis (Cope, 1871) (Large-scaled spiny-cheek sleeper)
 Eleotris andamensis Herre, 1939
 Eleotris annobonensis Blanc, Cadenat & Stauch, 1968
 Eleotris aquadulcis G. R. Allen & Coates, 1990 (Freshwater sleeper)
 Eleotris balia D. S. Jordan & Seale, 1905
 Eleotris belizianus Sauvage, 1880
 Eleotris bosetoi Mennesson, Keith, Ebner & Gerbeaux, 2016 
 Eleotris daganensis Steindachner, 1870
 Eleotris douniasi Keith, Mennesson, Dahruddin & Hubert, 2021
 Eleotris fasciatus T. R. Chen, 1964
 Eleotris feai Thys van den Audenaerde & Tortonese, 1974
 Eleotris fusca (Bloch & J. G. Schneider, 1801) (Dusky sleeper)
 Eleotris lutea F. Day, 1876 (Lutea sleeper)
 Eleotris mauritiana E. T. Bennett, 1832 (Wide-head sleeper)
 Eleotris macrolepis Bleeker, 1875
 Eleotris melanosoma Bleeker, 1853 (Broad-head sleeper)
 Eleotris oxycephala Temminck & Schlegel, 1845
 Eleotris pellegrini Maugé, 1984
 Eleotris perniger (Cope, 1871) (Small-scaled spiny-cheek sleeper)
 Eleotris picta Kner, 1863 (Spotted sleeper)
 Eleotris pisonis (J. F. Gmelin, 1789) (Spiny-cheek sleeper)
 Eleotris sandwicensis Vaillant & Sauvage, 1875 (Sandwich Island sleeper, Hawaiian sleeper, oopu)
 Eleotris senegalensis Steindachner, 1870
 Eleotris soaresi Playfair, 1867
 Eleotris sumatraensis Mennesson, Keith, Sukmono, Risdawati & Hubert, 2021
 Eleotris tecta W. A. Bussing, 1996
 Eleotris tubularis Heller & Snodgrass, 1903
 Eleotris vittata A. H. A. Duméril, 1861
 Eleotris vomerodentata Maugé, 1984
 Eleotris woworae Keith, Mennesson, Sauri & Hubert, 2021

References

 
Freshwater fish genera
Marine fish genera
Taxa named by Marcus Elieser Bloch